The Telos Doctor Who novellas were a series of tie-in novellas based on the long-running BBC science fiction television series Doctor Who, officially licensed by the BBC and published by Telos Publishing.

Each novella was published in two formats: standard hardback and deluxe hardback (which included a full colour artwork Frontispiece, and was signed and numbered. The cover material also differed from the standard edition). The BBC's license was specifically only to do hardback fiction (since its BBC Books imprint was concurrently publishing its own line of paperback Doctor Who novels), although following further negotiations two of the novellas were subsequently re-printed in paperback (Ghost Ship and Foreign Devils). "Deluxe editions" were also published, which were numbered and autographed by the author, the Frontispiece artist, and the author of the Foreword. (For example, the deluxe edition of Nightdreamers was signed by the author (Tom Arden), the illustrator (Martin McKenna), and actress Katy Manning who wrote the foreword and whose character Jo Grant appears in the book.)

Fallen Gods won the Aurealis Award for best Australian science fiction novel of 2004.

The Eye of the Tyger was also published in a third, very limited edition for Doctor Who'''s 40th anniversary. This was a special slipcased edition which additionally included three plates of artwork placed throughout the book by Walter Howarth, Andrew Skilleter and Fred Gambino. There were 40 numbered copies only and in addition to being signed by author Paul McAuley, Foreword author Neil Gaiman and Frontispiece artist Jim Burns, were also signed by the additional artists and autographed by actor Paul McGann, who played the 8th Doctor.

Characters from the novella The Cabinet of Light also feature in the Time Hunter'' series of novellas by Telos.

List

External links
Telos website
The TARDIS Library'''s listing of Telos Doctor Who'' novellas

 
Telos Publishing books
Book series introduced in 2001